The Porsche 934/5 is a 1977 racing car that was designed as a hybrid of the Porsche 934 and Porsche 935 to compete in Racing Group 4 of the IMSA.

History 
The Porsche 934/5 was assembled from 10 samples of Porsche 934 and Porsche 935, by incorporating the Chassis and engine of the 934 with the wheels, tires and rear wing configuration of the 935, creating the new 934/5.   The goal for the new design was to compete in the Group 4 racing competition of the IMSA (International Motor Sport Association) in 1977. On January 22, 1977, Peter Gregg (racing driver) and Brumos crew team flew to Germany, in order to acquire the resources necessary for this new car under construction to be assembled. Gregg and his team decided to fit the 934 with the 935's rear wing and to add a turbocharger, so that they could compete with the other racing cars, such as the more powerful DeKon Monzas. The name has been carefully selected and origins from the Porsche 911 Turbo (code-named 930). The "4" in the name comes from the fact that the 934/5 was built to compete in the Group 4 of the IMSA.

Design 

For the design of the Porsche 934/5, Porsche was strongly inspired by its previous models. The basis for design has been influenced by the Porsche 934. However, Peter Gregg and his team made the decision to fit the newly designed car with the large rear spoiler, the widened body work and the big fenders from the composition of the Porsche 935. The widened body work was required for the large rear wheels to fit. The result of the mixture between the 934 and 935 is a prototype-looking car, ready to dominate the racing tracks, which it was designed for.

Motorsport 
The Porsche 934/5 did not participate in many races, since the IMSA banned the 934/5 before it could compete in its first race. Due to this ban, the designers decided to enroll their machine in the rival SCAA Trans Am Series, in which the Porsche participated and won 6 out of the 8 races. These victories would mean that the 934/5 would be the 1977 champion, however, due to a formal protest against the 934/5 by Ludwig Heimrath, the officials declared Ludwig and his Porsche 934 champions of 1977.

Specifications 

– Source: 

The creation of this car has been made possible by a change in rules. In the 1977, the IMSA had implemented a rule that allowed Porsche racers to add a single turbocharger to their cars, to increase their competitiveness versus the rival race cars which featured more horsepowers. As a result, a 3 Liter Flat-six engine (also referred as the boxer engine), fitted with a single KKK turbocharger, that could generate 590 bhp, and go 0 to 60 in 5.6 seconds was created for the 934/5 . The car also sported huge rear wheels, which made it a tough job to drive the car correctly, especially at high speeds.

Auctions 
Due to the fact that Porsche only built 10 of the 934/5, the price to pay in order to purchase one can vary.
These prices are established at auctions. For the last known sales figures of the 934/5, the Gooding Amelia Auction has auctioned one of the ten models for $1,375,000.

Single cars

Chassis 9307700952 
 
 
This chassis number belongs to the second 934/5 to be produced and was purchased by Peter Gregg in 1977. It arrived in Jacksonville between February and March 1977. This car needed preparations in order to compete in group 4 of IMSA. The car did not meet the IMSA standards and was disqualified, however, Peter Gregg decided to enroll the car for the Trans Am racing series. 
Peter Gregg won the 1977 SCCA Trans-Am Championship with this car.

Chassis 9307700958 
 

The chassis number mentioned above was the eighth customer delivery and was driven by  Ludwig Heimrath in 1977 in the IMSA and Trans Am racing series.
Heimrath won the Trans Am racing series with this model, which afterwards was converted into a Porsche 935.
In 1980 the car was retired and parked in a warehouse in Toronto.

Chassis 9307700957 
 

This car was the seventh to be produced, it was purchased for nearly $42,000 by Porsche-Audi dealer Bob Hagestad Racing. His intention was to participate with the car in the IMSA and Trans Am series. Hagestad was on board as a co-driver.
At the end of the season the car finished with 10 podium appearances in 15 races and got an overall 2nd place in the 1977 IMSA Championship.
Between 1978 and 1980 the car got upgraded to 935 specifications and took part in many races.
Currently the car got restored to its original 934.5 configuration.

Chassis 9307700956 
 

This model was the only one to be newly sold to a European customer. It has many features and characteristics making it a "one-off'.The car has participated in several races throughout Europe. The Italian Ciro Nappi purchased it in 1977 and raced it in the Giro d'Italia automobilistico but had to retire from the competition due to family issues.
It was then bought by Dino Male who won two races in the Italian Group 4 Championship. In 1978 the car got sold to a German customer and appeared in many of the races in the season of 1979.
In 1984, D. Goseny bought the car and sold it to Ian Kenney who completed a restoration in 1995. The car was afterwards displayed at concours events.

Other appearances  
 The Porsche 934/5 has its own Hot Wheels model, which is based on the classic colors in which the car raced in the seventies. This model was designed by Ryu Asada and Jun Imai in 2017.

 The design of the Porsche 934/5 still inspires many Porsche tuners to this day, such as RWB, that fancy the same characteristics in the cars they modify.

References

External links  
 International Motor Sport Association
 Official Porsche Website
 Petrolicious
 Sports Car Club of America 
 Trans Am Series
 The perfect 1977 Peter Gregg Porsche 9345

934/5
Sports racing cars